Below is a list of the busiest airports in France, including its overseas departments and territories.

Graphics

Metropolitan France

Overseas France

2018

2014

Source:

2013

Source: Wayback Machine

2012

Source: Wayback Machine

2011

Source: Wayback Machine

2010

Source: Wayback Machine

2007-2008

Source : Wayback Machine

See also 
 Top 10 Busiest Airports in the World

References

Busy
France
Busiest